High Violet is the fifth studio album by The National, which was released on May 10, 2010 in Europe and on May 11, 2010 in North America via 4AD. The band produced the album themselves, assisted by Peter Katis with whom they worked on their previous albums Alligator and Boxer at their own studio in Brooklyn, New York, and at Katis' Tarquin Studios in Bridgeport, Connecticut. The sculpture on the album cover was created by artist Mark Fox, and is called The Binding Force.

An expanded edition of High Violet was released through 4AD on November 22, 2010. The reissue includes the standard 11-track album along with a new bonus disc, featuring the unreleased tracks "You Were a Kindness" and "Wake Up Your Saints" as well as alternate versions, B-sides, and live recordings.

Release
On March 10, 2010, they performed opening track "Terrible Love" on Late Night with Jimmy Fallon, two months before the album's release.

The album's first single "Bloodbuzz Ohio" was made available for download on the band's website on March 24, 2010. The song was also released on 7" vinyl (with the exclusive B-side "Sin-Eaters") on May 3, 2010.

On April 19, 2010, a low-quality version of the album was leaked onto the internet in its entirety which prompted the band to announce that the album would be streaming on The New York Times website from April 23 until April 27,The National Agenda - NYTimes.com then on NPR's website until May 11.

On May 13, 2010, the band played "Afraid of Everyone" on the Late Show with David Letterman. Sufjan Stevens sang backup for them during this performance.

High Violet sold 51,000 copies in its first week of sales, charting at number three on the Billboard 200. This marked the National's highest charting effort at the time (beating Boxer, which debuted at number 68), until the release of Sleep Well Beast in 2017, which debuted at number two.

In May 2013, the band played High Violet track "Sorrow" 105 times in a row at an art installation in New York, in a performance lasting six hours. This durational performance was released as a special vinyl-only box set entitled A Lot of Sorrow by 4AD in June 2015.

In June 2020, the expanded edition of High Violet was released on vinyl for the first time as the 10th Anniversary Expanded Edition.

Critical reception

High Violet was released to widespread critical acclaim. At Metacritic, which assigns a normalized rating out of 100 based on reviews from mainstream critics, the album received a score of 85 out of 100 based on 36 reviews, indicating "universal acclaim". BBC Music critic Mike Diver hailed the album as the National's "finest disc to date" and "a potential album of the year". Andrew Gaerig of Pitchfork wrote that "when they aim for powerful or poetic, they get there" and described High Violet as "the sound of a band taking a mandate to be a meaningful rock band seriously." Steven Hyden of The A.V. Club called the album "carefully considered without being labored" and "richly detailed without being fussy". The Guardians Dave Simpson wrote that High Violet "is beautifully subtle" and "grows in power with each listen", and The Independents Andy Gill called it "a masterclass in subtle emotional shading". Sputnikmusic writer Channing Freeman cited the album as the band's "third masterpiece in a row".

High Violet appeared on several publications' year-end lists of the best albums of 2010. Time named it the fourth best album of the year, and it also placed at number 15 on Rolling Stones list of the 30 best albums of 2010. Pitchfork placed it at number 28 on their list of the 50 best albums of 2010. Exclaim! ranked High Violet at number 7 on their list of the Best Pop & Rock Albums of 2010, with critic Travis Persaud stating that it "continues the envious feat of releasing another album that's superior to its predecessor." The album placed at number eight on The Village Voices year-end Pazz & Jop critics' poll. High Violet was awarded a Q Award for Best Album, an honor presented to the National by English musician Bernard Sumner. The album was also included in the 2011 edition of the book 1001 Albums You Must Hear Before You Die. In 2019, Pitchfork ranked the album at number 147 on their list of "The 200 Best Albums of the 2010s".

Chart history
The album debuted at number three on the US Billboard and also debuted in Canada at number two, in Portugal at number three, and in Germany at number 10. High Violet was certified gold in Canada, Denmark, Belgium, and the United Kingdom. In 2011 it was awarded a diamond certification from the Independent Music Companies Association, which indicated sales of at least 200,000 copies throughout Europe.

In popular culture
A number of tracks from the album have featured variously throughout popular culture.

 The track "Vanderlyle Crybaby Geeks" featured at the climax of the second season of the SyFy series Warehouse 13.
 "Vanderlyle Crybaby Geeks" was also featured in the sixth episode of the fifth and final season of Money Heist.
 The track "Runaway" was used in the 2013 film Warm Bodies.
 The track "England" was used in 2018 by BBC Sport in a montage detailing England's penalty shootout victory over Colombia at the 2018 FIFA World Cup in Russia.
 The expanded edition track "You Were a Kindness" featured at the climax of the Apple TV+ miniseries Defending Jacob.

Track listing

Personnel
 Matt Berninger – lead vocals
 Aaron Dessner – guitars, keyboard, bass
 Bryce Dessner – guitars
 Bryan Devendorf – drums, percussion
 Scott Devendorf – bass, guitar
 Produced by the National
 Additional production by Aaron Dessner, Bryce Dessner, and Peter Katis
 Recorded between March 2009 and January 2010 in Aaron's garage (Brooklyn, NY) by Peter Mavrogeorgis, Brandon Reid, Aaron Dessner, and Bryce Dessner
 Additional recording at Tarquin Studios (Bridgeport, CT) by Peter Katis, and at Kampo Studios (NYC) by Patrick Dillett
 Second engineer: Greg Georgio; assisted by Keith J Nelson
 Additional vocal recording by Christian Biegai (Berlin, Germany)
 Mixed by Peter Katis
 Additional mixing by Greg Georgio
 Mastered by Greg Calbi at Sterling Sound (NYC)
 Orchestration by Bryce Dessner and Padma Newsome, except "Vanderlyle Crybaby Geeks" and "Lemonworld" by Nico Muhly
 Cover sculpture – The Binding Force by Mark Fox
 Photography by Keith Klenowski
 Design by Distant Station Ltd.Additional musicians'
 Tim Albright – trombone
 Hideaki Aomori – clarinet, bass clarinet
 Michael Atkinson – French horn
 Thomas Bartlett – piano, keyboards
 Mads Christian Brauer – electronics and filtering
 CJ Camereri – trumpet, cornet
 Greg Chudzik – double bass
 Rachael Elliott – bassoon
 Alex Hamlin – baritone saxophone
 Marla Hansen – vocals
 Maria Jeffers – cello
 Bridget Kibbey – harp
 Thom Kozumplik – percussion
 Benjamin Lanz – trombone
 Rob Moose – violin
 Nico Muhly – celeste
 Dave Nelson – trombone
 Padma Newsome – violin, viola
 Richard Reed Parry – double bass, electric guitar, piano, vocals, backing vocal arrangements (on "Conversation 16")
 Kyle Resnick – trumpet
 Nadia Sirota – viola
 Alex Sopp – flute, bass flute
 Laurel Sprengelmeyer (Little Scream) – vocals
 Sufjan Stevens – harmonium, vocals, backing vocal arrangements (on "Afraid of Everyone")
 Jeremy Thal – French horn
 Justin Vernon – vocals

Charts

Weekly charts

Year-end charts

Certifications and sales

Release history

References

2010 albums
The National (band) albums
4AD albums
Albums produced by Aaron Dessner